The Belle Of Avenue A is a 1969 studio album by the Fugs, a band composed of anti-war poets.  It was released in the USA by record company Reprise.  The album was first released on CD as part of the 2006 3-CD box set, Electromagnetic Steamboat, and eventually as a stand-alone CD in 2011 on the Wounded Bird label (WOU 6539).

Track listing
 "Bum's Song"
 "Dust Devil"
 "Chicago"
 "Four Minutes to Twelve"
 "Mr. Mack"
 "Belle of Avenue A"
 "Queen of the Nile"
 "Flower Children"
 "Yodeling Yippie"
 "Children of the Dream"

Personnel
Tuli Kupferberg - vocals
Ed Sanders - vocals
Ken Weaver - drums, vocals
Dan Hamburg (tracks 1, 6, 7 & 9), Ken Pine (tracks 2-5, 8 & 10) - guitar, vocals 
Jim Pepper - flute (track 8)
Bill Wolf - bass, vocals (tracks 2-5, 8 & 10)
Bob Mason - drums (tracks 2-5, 8 & 10)

References

The Fugs albums
1969 albums
Reprise Records albums
Albums produced by Ed Sanders